Bennett Spur is a rock spur between Wujek Ridge and Cox Nunatak in the Dufek Massif, Pensacola Mountains. It was named by the Advisory Committee on Antarctic Names in 1979 after David W. Bennett who, with Robin D. Worcester, comprised the first of the annual United States Geological Survey satellite surveying teams at the South Pole Station, winter party 1973.

References
 

Ridges of Queen Elizabeth Land